GPL is the GNU General Public License, a free software license.

GPL may also refer to:

Sport and gaming
 Garena Premier League, a League of Legends league
 Goa Professional League, a football league in India

Other uses
 Glider pilot license